Ernst Akert (born 20 April 1871; died after 1942) was a Swiss freethinker.

Biography
Akert is one of the founders of the defeated Swiss Freethinkers Association [Freidenkerbund] during the First World War. Among the things he wrote for the Freidenkerbund and published writings about the Walser. In 1942 he published a monograph titled Gottfried Keller's Weltanschauung,  in which he discussed the position of the Swiss writer on God, immortality, religion and the Church; this is Akert's most common writing style.

In 1942, Akert moved to Lugano after living in Bern for many years.

References 

Swiss non-fiction writers
Secular humanists
20th-century Swiss writers
1871 births
Year of death missing